The Secret Escapades of Velvet Anderson is an album by American jazz flautist Nicole Mitchell, which was recorded in 2013 and released on the French RogueArt label. It was the second recording by Sonic Projections, a quartet featuring pianist Craig Taborn, saxophonist David Boykin and drummer Chad Taylor. The album title is a tribute to Chicago saxophonist Fred Anderson and his Velvet Lounge club.

Reception
The All About Jazz review by John Sharpe states "As melodic passages rub shoulders with explosive rhythms and tricky unisons, Mitchell contrives a sequence of varied settings for the vibrant personalities in her cast. The CD launch concert proved the high point of the 2014 Vision Festival in NYC, and this disc measures well against that performance."

The Point of Departure review by Brian Morton says "The Secret Escapades of Velvet Anderson has a remarkable concentration of form and substance, revolving round identifiable cells and intervals, some of which, I suspect, may be intuitive rather than pre-planned or consciously written out."

Track listing
All compositions by Nicole Mitchell
 "Bright City" – 9:59
 "Secret Assignment" – 11:16
 "Discovery of the Jewel" – 2:24
 "For the Cause" – 7:41
 "Scaling the Underground" – 8:20
 "Anderson's Plan" – 7:05
 "Running the Rooftops" – 7:59
 "The Labyrinth of Capture" – 7:18
 "The Heroic Rescue" – 7:51

Personnel
Nicole Mitchell - flute
Craig Taborn – piano, wurlitzer 
David Boykin – tenor sax
Chad Taylor – drums, acoustic guitar

References

2014 albums
Nicole Mitchell (musician) albums
Tribute albums
RogueArt albums